Monte Carlo is a 1925 French silent drama film directed by Louis Mercanton and starring Carlyle Blackwell, Betty Balfour and Rachel Devirys. The film is based on the novel Prodigals of Monte Carlo by E. Phillips Oppenheim. The casting of Blackwell and Balfour in leading roles was intended to give the film appeal in the British market.

Cast
 Carlyle Blackwell as Sir Hargrave Wendever  
 Betty Balfour as Betty Oliver 
 Rachel Devirys as Madame de Fontanes 
 Jean-Louis Allibert as Robert Hewitt 
 Charles Lamy as Marquis de Villiers 
 Jean Aymé as Senor Trentino 
 Georges Térof as Wilson 
 Louis Kerly as Brandon  
 Noblet as Lord Pellingham  
 Henriette Clairval-Terof as Janitor  
 Robert English as Sir Philip Gorse 
 Lane as  Gregory Marston

References

Bibliography
 Goble, Alan. The Complete Index to Literary Sources in Film. Walter de Gruyter, 1999.

External links 
 

1925 films
French drama films
French silent feature films
1925 drama films
1920s French-language films
Films directed by Louis Mercanton
Films based on British novels
Films set in Monaco
French black-and-white films
Silent drama films
1920s French films